Switzerland competed at the 2011 World Championships in Athletics from August 27 to September 4 in Daegu, South Korea.

Team selection

A team of 18 athletes was
announced to represent the country
in the event.  For the first time in history, Switzerland will send two 4 × 100 m
relay teams to world championships.  The team includes one athlete invited by the IPC for exhibition events: Manuela Schaer, 800m T53 (wheelchair) women.

The following athletes appeared on the preliminary Entry List, but not on the Official Start List of the specific event, resulting in a total number of 15 competitors:

Results

Men

Women

References

External links
Official local organising committee website
Official IAAF competition website

Nations at the 2011 World Championships in Athletics
World Championships in Athletics
Switzerland at the World Championships in Athletics